Inclusion and Democracy is a 2002 book by Iris Marion Young, published by Oxford University Press. In the book, Young considers democracy in a multicultural society, and recommends paths to more inclusive engagement in democratic politics.

References

External links
 

2002 non-fiction books
Feminist books